Tyrone Gross (born May 14, 1983 in Stockton, California) is a former American football running back. He was signed by the San Diego Chargers as an undrafted free agent in 2006. He played college football at Eastern Oregon.

Early years
Gross attended Lincoln High School in Stockton, California and was a student and a letterman in football. Tyronne Gross graduated from Lincoln High School in 2001.

College career
Gross played college football at Sacramento State University and Eastern Oregon University.

Professional career

San Diego Chargers
After going undrafted in the 2006 NFL Draft, Gross signed with the San Diego Chargers as an undrafted free agent. He spent his entire rookie season on the team's practice squad.

Gross suffered a dislocated kneecap during the 2007 preseason and was placed on season-ending injured reserve. He was not tendered as an exclusive-rights free agent in the 2008 offseason and spent the rest of the year out of football.

New York Sentinels
Gross was drafted by the New York Sentinels of the United Football League in the UFL Premiere Season Draft. He signed with the team on August 5, 2009.

External links
Just Sports Stats
United Football League bio

1983 births
Living people
Players of American football from Stockton, California
American football running backs
Eastern Oregon Mountaineers football players
San Diego Chargers players
New York Sentinels players